Mr. Rock Vocalist is the tenth studio album by American singer-songwriter Eric Martin, released on October 10, 2012, exclusively in Japan by Sony Music Japan. The album features English-language covers of songs by Japanese hard rock bands (as opposed to female-oriented Japanese ballads like the previous Mr. Vocalist albums), as well as two original songs featured in the pachinko game CR Virtua Fighter Revolution. It is the final album in the Mr. Vocalist series.

The album peaked at No. 40 on the Oricon Albums Chart.

Track listing

Charts

References

External links
 
 

2012 albums
Eric Martin (musician) albums
Sony Music albums
Hard rock albums by American artists